Meepitiya is a village in Sri Lanka. It is located within Central Province near to the city of Nawalapitiya. Most of the people of this Village are Sinhalese-Buddhist. They live peacefully with the minorities.

See also
List of towns in Central Province, Sri Lanka
 Kandy
 Mathale
 Nuwaraeliya
 Gampola
 Nawalapitiya
 Dambulla
 Thalawakele

External links

Populated places in Central Province, Sri Lanka